Grand Prix de l'Automobile Club Marocain - one lap of 709.5 km, 21 April 1930.

1st- Charles Bénitah (Amilcar), finished 5 minutes after 4PM.

2nd- Marcel Lehoux (Bugatti 2 L s/c), 149.6 km/h.

3rd- Hiercourt (Bugatti 1500 cc)

4th- Itier (Rally 1100 cc)

5th- Zehender (Bugatti T35B 2.3 L) 

DNF- Etancelin (Bugatti T35C 2 L s/c)

Handicap race

1st group, 1100 us/c, starting at 9:45 am

Madame Itier (Rally)

Dourel (Rally)

Namont (Salmson)

Mario (Salmson)

Jonioz (or Jorioz) (Salmson)

Charles Bénitah (Amilcar)

Kotchine (Amilcar)

2nd group, 1500 cc us/c, starting at 10:30 am

Hiercourt (Bugatti 1500 cc)

Boucly (Bugatti 1500 cc) 

3rd group, 1500 cc s/c, start 10:55 am

"Foc" (Bugatti 1500 s/c)

4th group, 2 L us/c, start 11:12 pm 

Clerckx (or Tony) (Bugatti 2 L)

5th group, start at 11:35 pm

Marcel Lehoux (Bugatti 2 L s/c)

de Maleplane (Bugatti T35C 2 L s/c)

Jean de l'Espée (Bugatti T35C 4928 2 L s/c) 

Etancelin (Bugatti 2.3 L) 

Zehender (Bugatti 3 L)

The race was initially planned one week before, on Sunday 13 April.
It was postponed because of heavy rain, wind and cloud of grasshoppers (sauterelles).

Fatal crash during practice, "Bruni" alias Comte Bruno d'Harcourt, died in a hospital Saturday 19 April. He was related to the Duc de Guise.

Anfa Grand Prix
Anfa Grand Prix
Moroccan Grand Prix